7 Escape is an upcoming South Korean television series starring Um Ki-joon, Hwang Jung-eum, Lee Joon, Lee Yu-bi, Shin Eun-kyung, Yoon Jong-hoon, and Jo Yoon-hee. It revolves around seven main characters. It is scheduled to premiere on SBS TV in September 2023.

Synopsis 
The series depicts the story of seven people involved in the case of a missing girl, who face huge events intertwined with many lies and desires. The drama will also depict the journey of searching for the truth as well as the bloody revenge that resembles divine punishment.

Cast

Main 
 Um Ki-joon as Matthew Lee
 A man who runs the biggest mobile platform company in South Korea, but he is a mysterious figure behind a veil. Only a few people know who he is. He gets involved in a bizarre case and this leads him to reveal himself to the public.
 Hwang Jung-eum as Geum Ra-hee 
 The CEO of a drama production company. She is skillful and aggressive at her job. Geum Ra-Hee values money and success the most in her life and she will take any path to achieve that. To receive a huge inheritance, she tries to find her daughter whom she abandoned 15 years ago.
 Lee Joon as Min Do-hyeok
 A man who used to be a gangster. He does not have a dream or hope for his life. If he trusts someone once, he will trust them for good. Due to this, his life is filled with a series of betrayals.
 Lee Yu-bi as Han Mo-ne
 A young woman wants to become an idol and she is admired by her friends. She seems to have a perfect life with a beautiful appearance and rich family background, but she has a weakness. Her weakness is that she consistently turns out lies. Her life is full of these lies.
 Shin Eun-kyung as Cha Ju-ran
 An OB-GYN. She lives with Bang Chil-Sung (Lee Deok-Hwa), who is much older than her. Bang Chil-Sung is a very wealthy man and Cha Ju-Ran loves the money he has.
 Yoon Jong-hoon as Yang Jin-mo
 The CEO of Cherry Entertainment. He is usually gentle, but once his anger explodes nobody stops him. He is extremely greedy and will do anything for profit.
 Jo Yoon-hee as Go Myung-ji
 An art teacher at school. She creates a lie to protect something precious to her and she spreads a weird rumor at school to hide her weak point.

Supporting 
 Jo Jae-yoon as Nam Cheol-woo
 Lee Deok-hwa as Bang Chil-sung 
 Yoon Tae-young
 Kim Ki-doo

Production

Development 
The work brings together author Kim Soon-ok with director Jo Dong min for the third time after the series The Last Empress (2018) and The Penthouse: War in Life (2020-21). The series will be produced by SBS Drama Division called Studio S, in cooperation with Chorokbaem Media. 

On February 24, an official with drama "7 Escape" revealed to Newsen, that the series is preparing for a second season.

Filming 
On September 22, 2022, the cast was confirmed with the start of filming for the series.

On December 5, 2022, the production company apologized for illegally parking a small car on the sidewalk and paid a fine to the Parking Management Division of the Administrative Support Bureau of the District Office.

References

External links 
  
 

Korean-language television shows
Seoul Broadcasting System television dramas
Television series by Studio S
Television series by Chorokbaem Media
Television series about revenge
Television shows written by Kim Soon-ok
2023 South Korean television series debuts

Upcoming television series